Events in the year 1069 in Norway.

Incumbents
Monarch - Magnus II Haraldsson along with Olaf III Haraldsson

Events

Births

Deaths
28 April – Magnus II of Norway, king (born c.1049).

References

Norway